Epilepia simulata is a species of snout moth in the genus Epilepia. It is known from northern Nigeria.

References

Moths described in 1931
Epipaschiinae